The Proximity Effect is the second studio album by Laki Mera and their first release from the Just Music label. Released in May 2011, the album was well-received, being described in The Sunday Times as "a dense folktronic architecture with an intricacy and subtlety that recalls the Blue Nile, Cocteau Twins and Portishead." The single, "Fool", from the album was named The Daily Record's single of the week.

Track listing

Personnel 
 Andrea Gobbi - Programming, synths, guitars
 Laura Donnelly - Vocals, Guitars, Synths
 Keir Long - Programming, Synths
 Tim Harbinson - Drums
 Trevor Helliwell - Cello, Synths
 Laki Mera - Engineering

References

External links 
 Laki Mera on Myspace

2011 albums
Laki Mera albums